Kim Ki-soo (September 17, 1939 – June 10, 1997) was a South Korean former professional boxer who competed from 1961 to 1969. He was South Korea's first world boxing champion, having held the undisputed WBA and WBC super-welterweight titles from 1966 to 1968.

Amateur career 
Kim graduated from Kyung Hee University's College of Physical Education. He competed in boxing at the 1958 Asian Games in Tokyo, where he earned the gold medal of the welterweight division by defeating Soren Pirjanian of Iran, on points, in the final. He went on to represent South Korea as a welterweight at the 1960 Rome Olympic Games, where he defeated Henry Perry (Ireland) on points, but then lost to Nino Benvenuti (Italy) on points.

Professional career 
Kim turned professional in 1961 and captured the WBC, WBA and  Lineal light middleweight title when he upset Nino Benvenuti by split decision in 1966. He defended the belt twice before losing it to Sandro Mazzinghi in 1968 by split decision.  He retired the following year.

Later life 
After his retirement, Kim worked as a boxing coach. He later started his own company, and was successful in business. He died of liver cancer on 10 June 1997, at the age of 57. He was survived by his wife Jeong Ha-ja (鄭夏子), two sons, and two daughters.

Professional boxing record

See also
List of world light-middleweight boxing champions

References

External links

Kim Ki-soo - CBZ Profile

1939 births
1997 deaths
People from Pukchong County
Kyung Hee University alumni
Boxers at the 1958 Asian Games
Olympic boxers of South Korea
Boxers at the 1960 Summer Olympics
Asian Games medalists in boxing
Deaths from cancer in South Korea
Deaths from liver cancer
South Korean male boxers
Asian Games gold medalists for South Korea
Medalists at the 1958 Asian Games
World Boxing Association champions
World Boxing Council champions
Light-middleweight boxers
World light-middleweight boxing champions